Association football – commonly known as football (or soccer in the United States and Canada), – is a popular sport in Andorra.  Prior to political developments in 1994, most football in the landlocked principality had been amateur with the notable exception of FC Andorra which has played in the Spanish football league system since 1948.

The Andorran Football Federation – the country's national football governing body – runs the Andorra national football team, as well as administering the nation's professional leagues the Andorran First and Andorran Second divisions.  The national federation also organizes the Copa Constitució annual tournament and the one-off Andorran Supercup.

History
After the 1993 Andorran constitutional referendum resulted in independence for the state, the Andorran Football Federation was founded in 1994.  The FAF was admitted to FIFA and UEFA in 1996, the same year the national team was organized. The country is represented in association football by the Andorra national football team. The men's national team played its first friendly at the Camp d'Esports d'Aixovall on 13 November 1996 losing to Estonia 1–6.  The team gained its first competitive win in a European Championship qualifier on 11 October 2019, against Moldova.  Since then the national team has recorded seven victories, one each against Albania, Belarus, Hungary, Liechtenstein, North Macedonia, Moldova and San Marino. They are one of the most penalized teams in Europe, having received more red and yellow cards in the WC 2006 Qualifiers than any other team. CE Principat was the first Andorran team to represent the nation in European Club Competitions appearing in the first qualifying round of the 1997–98, 1998–98, and 1999–2000 UEFA Cups.

League system
Professional football in Andorra is organized by the national federation and currently consists of two professional leagues.  The Lliga Nacional de Fútbol, also known as Primera Divisió (First Division) or as Lliga Multisegur Assegurances for sponsorship reasons., is the top football league.  The Andorran Segona Divisió (Second Division), or Lliga UNIDA for sponsorship reasons, is the second highest football league in Andorra.  The system has a hierarchical format with promotion and relegation between the leagues.

FC Andorra

Futbol Club Andorra is a professional football club based in Encamp, Andorra, established in 1942. Although based in Andorra, they have competed in the Spanish football league system since 1948. They currently play in Primera División RFEF – Group 2, the third tier.

Football stadiums in Andorra

See also
Football in Spain
Football in Catalonia

References

External links
  League321.com - Andorran football league tables, records & statistics database.